K-1 World Grand Prix 2008 in Seoul Final 16 was a martial arts event held by the K-1 on Saturday September 27, 2008 at the Olympic Gymnastics Arena in Seoul, Korea. It was the Final Elimination tournament for top sixteen fighters. The winners qualified for the K-1 World GP 2008 Final held on December 6, 2008 at Yokohama Arena, Japan.

The eight finalists from K-1 World GP 2007 Final were automatically qualified, then four World GP 2008 tournament winners in Amsterdam, Fukuoka, Taipei and Hawaii. The last four spots were selected by fan voting.

The K-1 World GP 2008 Final 16 attracted a crowd of 15,769 to the Seoul Olympic Complex and was broadcast live across South Korea by CJ Media and in Japan on the Fuji TV Network.

Qualifying events

K-1 World GP 2008 in Fukuoka

The winner was Ewerton Teixeira.  For more information, see K-1 World Grand Prix 2008 in Fukuoka.

K-1 World GP 2008 in Amsterdam

* Reserve Fight winner Brian Douwes replaced Freddy Kemayo in the Semi Finals as Freddy Kemayo was unable to continue due to injury

K-1 World GP 2008 in Taipei

* Reserve Fight winner Vaughn Anderson replaced Makoto Uehara in the Semi Finals as Makoto Uehara was unable to continue due to injury

K-1 World GP 2008 in Hawaii

* Reserve Fight winner Randy Kim replaced Mighty Mo in the Semi Finals as Mighty Mo could not continue due to injury

Fan Voting Results

Paul Slowinski earned a wild-card spot on the card through a fan poll on the K-1 website. 
Ray Sefo of New Zealand and Chalid "Die Faust" Arrab from Germany were also voted into the tournament.

Results

Opening Fights: K-1 Rules / 3Min. 3R Ext. 1R
Keijiro Maeda  vs Min Ho Song 
Maeda defeated Song by KO (Right Low Kick) at 1:43 of the 3rd Round.

Zabit Samedov  vs Fabiano da Silva 
Samedov defeated da Silva by 3rd Round Unanimous Decision 3-0 (30-28, 30-28, 30-29).

Yong Soo Park  vs Randy Kim 
Kim defeated Park by KO (Right Low Kick) at 1:11 of the 2nd Round.

Final 16 : K-1 Rules / 3Min. 3R Ext. 2R
Ruslan Karaev  vs Chalid Arrab 
Karaev defeated Arrab by KO (3 Knockdown, Punche Rush) at 2:30 of the 2nd Round.

Jerome Le Banner  vs Junichi Sawayashiki 
Le Banner defeated Sawayashiki by 3rd Round Unanimous Decision 3-0 (30-26, 30-27, 30-28).

Ray Sefo  vs Gokhan Saki 
Saki defeated Sefo by Extra Round Unanimous Decision 3-0 (10-9, 10-9, 10-9). After 3 rounds the judges had scored it Decision Draw 0-0 (29-29, 30-30, 30-30).

Glaube Feitosa  vs Errol Zimmerman 
Zimmerman defeated Feitosa by 3rd Round Unanimous Decision 3-0 (30-26, 30-26, 30-26).

Remy Bonjasky  vs Paul Slowinski 
Bonjasky defeated Slowinski by 3rd Round Majority Decision 2-0 (30-29, 30-30, 30-29).

Ewerton Teixeira  vs Musashi 
Teixeira defeated Musashi by 3rd Round Unanimous Decision 3-0 (30-28, 30-28, 30-28).

Badr Hari  vs Hong-man Choi 
Hari defeated Hong-man by TKO (Corner stoppage) at the beginning of the Extra Round. After 3 rounds the judges had scored it a Majority Draw 1-0 (28-29, 28-28, 28-28) in favour of Hong-man.

Semmy Schilt  vs Peter Aerts 
Aerts defeated Schilt by 3rd Round Majority Decision 2-0 (30-29, 30-29, 30-30).

See also
List of K-1 events
List of K-1 champions
List of male kickboxers

References

External links
K-1 Official Website
K-1sport.de - Your Source for Everything K-1

K-1 events
2008 in kickboxing
Kickboxing in South Korea
Sport in Seoul